The Jaunpur Sultanate was a Persianate Muslim kingdom in northern India between 1394 and 1479, ruled by the Sharqi dynasty. It was founded in 1394 by Khwajah-i-Jahan Malik Sarwar, an eunuch slave and former wazir of Sultan Nasiruddin Muhammad Shah IV Tughluq, amidst the disintegration of the Delhi Sultanate's Tughlaq dynasty. Centred in Jaunpur, the Sultanate extended authority over Awadh and a large part of the Ganges-Yamuna Doab. It reached its greatest height under the rule of Sultan Ibrahim Shah, who also vastly contributed to the development of Islamic education in the Sultanate. In 1479, Sultan Hussain Khan was defeated by the forces of Afghan ruler Bahlul Lodi, Sultan of the Lodi dynasty of the Delhi Sultanate, which abruptly brought an end to independent Jaunpur and its reabsorption into the Delhi Sultanate.

Origin
The Sharqi dynasty was founded by Malik Sarwar, an eunuch slave of probably African origin. Earlier, he had adopted Malik Qaranfal, a Hindu slave-boy, and his brothers. Malik Qaranfal became the next sultan with the title of Mubarak Shah. He was succeeded by his brother, Ibrahim Shah.

History

Malik Sarwar 
In 1389, Malik Sarwar received the title of Khwajah-i-Jahan. In 1394, he was appointed as the governor of Jaunpur and received his title of Malik-us-Sharq from Sultan Nasir-ud-Din Mahmud Shah Tughluq (1394–1413). Soon, he established himself as an independent ruler and took the title of Atabak-i-Azam. He suppressed the rebellions in Etawah, Koil and Kanauj. He was also able to bring under his control Kara, Awadh, Dalmau, Bahraich and South Bihar. The Rai of Jajnagar and the ruler of Lakhnauti acknowledged his authority and sent him a number of elephants.

War with the Ujjainiyas of Bhojpur

During the reign of Malik Sarwar, Jaunpur became embroiled in a 100-year war with the neighbouring Ujjainiyas of Bhojpur in modern-day Bihar. The Ujjainiya chieftain, Raja Harraj was initially successful in the forces of Malik Sarwar however the Ujjainiyas were defeated in subsequent battles and retreated in the forests and resort to guerrilla warfare.

Mubarak Shah
Malik Sarwar was succeeded by his adopted son Malik Qaranfal after his death, who assumed the title of Mubarak Shah, ruled three years, and issued coins in his own name. After assuming power in 1399, Mubarak Shah struck coins in his own name and the Khutba was read in his name. During his reign, Mallu Iqbal tried to recover Jaunpur, but failed. He was succeeded by his younger brother Ibrahim after his death in 1402, who took the title of Shams-ud-Din Ibrahim Shah.

Ibrahim Shah

The Jaunpur Sultanate attained its greatest height under the younger brother of Mubarak Shah, who ruled as Shams ud-din Ibrahim Shah (ruled 1402–1440). To the east, his kingdom extended to Bihar, and to the west, to Kanauj; he even marched on Delhi at one point. Under the aegis of a Muslim holy man named Nur Qutb Alam, he threatened the Sultanate of Bengal under Raja Ganesha.

Ibrahim Shah was a patron of Islamic learning and established a number of colleges for this purpose. A large number of scholarly works on Islamic theology and law was produced during his reign, which include the Hashiah-i-Hindi, the Bahar-ul-Mawwaj and the Fatwa-i-Ibrahim Shahi. He constructed a number of monuments in a new regional style of architecture known as the Sharqi. During his reign, Sultan Nasiruddin Mahmud Shah II Tughluq took refuge in Jaunpur in order to get rid of the control of Mallu Iqbal over him. But he did not treat Sultan Mahmud Shah well. As a result, his relations with the Sultan became bitter and Mahmud Shah occupied Kanauj. In 1407, he tried to recover Kanauj but failed. His attempt to conquer Bengal also failed. He was succeeded by his eldest son Mahmud Shah after his death.

Mahmud Shah

Mahmud Shah was successful in conquering Chunar, but failed to capture Kalpi. He also conducted campaigns against Bengal and Odisha. The monarch of Odisha at that time was the legendary Kapilendra Deva Gajapati. The Odia forces defeated the Jaunpur Sultanate comprehensively. In 1452, he invaded Delhi but was defeated by Bahlul Lodi. Later, he made another attempt to conquer Delhi and marched into Etawah. Finally, he agreed to a treaty which accepted the right of Bahlul Lodi over Shamsabad. But when Bahlul tried to take possession of Shamsabad, he was opposed by the forces of Jaunpur. At this juncture, Mahmud Shah died and he was succeeded by his son Bhikhan, who assumed the title of Muhammad Shah.

Muhammad Shah

On assuming power in 1457, Muhammad Shah made peace with Bahlul Lodi and recognised his right over Shamsabad. He picked up a quarrel with his nobles. In 1458, after his brother Hasan was executed on his order, his other brother Hussain revolted and proclaimed himself as the sultan of Jaunpur, under the title of Hussain Shah. Muhammed Shah was soon killed by Hussain's army in Kanauj.

Hussain Shah

The last ruler Hussain Shah signed a four years' peace treaty with Bahlul Lodi in 1458. Later, in order to invade Delhi reached the banks of the Yamuna with a very large army in 1478. Sultan Bahlul Lodi tried to secure peace by offering to retain only Delhi and govern it as a vassal of Hussain Shah but he rejected the offer. 

As a result, Sultan Bahlul crossed the Yamuna and defeated him. Hussain Shah agreed for truce but again captured Etawah and marched towards Delhi with a huge army and he was again defeated by Bahlul Lodi. He was able to make peace this time also. In March 1479, he again arrived at the banks of Yamuna. He was again defeated by Bahlul Lodi and lost the Parganas of Kampil, Patiali, Shamsabad, Suket, Koil, Marhara and Jalesar to the advancing army of the Delhi Sultan. After the successive defeats in the battles of Senha, Rapri and Raigaon Khaga, he was finally defeated on the banks of the Rahab, after which Bahlul Lodi appointed Mubarak Khan to Jaunpur. Hussain Shah re-assembled his forces, expelled Mubarak Khan and re-occupied Jaunpur, until Bahlul drove him out again. He fled to Bengal, where he was granted asylum by sultan Alauddin Husain Shah and spent his last days there. In 1486, Bahlul Lodi placed his eldest surviving son Barbak Shah Lodi on the throne of Jaunpur. It was during Hussain Shah' rule that a claimant to be the mahdi of all Muslims, Muhammad Jaunpuri, appeared and Hussain Shah was an admirer of him.

Art and architecture

The Sharqi rulers of Jaunpur were known for their patronage of learning and architecture. Jaunpur was known as the Shiraz of India during this period. Most notable examples of Sharqi style of architecture in Jaunpur are the Atala Masjid, the Lal Darwaza Masjid and the Jama Masjid. Though the foundation of the Atala Masjid was laid by Firuz Shah Tughluq in 1376, it was completed only during the rule of Ibrahim Shah in 1408. Another mosque, the Jhanjhari Masjid was also built by Ibrahim Shah in 1430. The Lal Darwaja Masjid (1450) was built during the reign of the next ruler Mahmud Shah. The Jama Masjid was built in 1470, during the rule of the last ruler Hussain Shah.

Music
The last ruler Hussain Shah assumed the title of Gandharva and contributed significantly in the development of Khayal, a genre of Hindustani classical music. He also composed several new ragas (melodies).

Rulers of Sharqi dynasty

Notes

External links
Coin Gallery - Jaunpur Sultanat
Coins of Jaunpur Sultanate
History of Jaunpur Sultanate

Empires and kingdoms of India
Islamic rule in the Indian subcontinent
Former sultanates
Shia dynasties
History of Uttar Pradesh
Jaunpur Sultanate